Bernardino Scala (1581 – 19 January 1667) was a Roman Catholic prelate who served as Bishop of Montefeltro (1643–1667) and Bishop of Bisceglie (1637–1643).

Biography
Bernardino Scala was born in Serra Sant'Abbondio, Italy in 1581. 
On 12 January 1637, he was appointed during the papacy of Pope Urban VIII as Bishop of Bisceglie.
On 25 January 1637, he was consecrated bishop by Antonio Marcello Barberini, Cardinal-Priest of Sant'Onofrio, with Faustus Poli, Titular Archbishop of Amasea, and Celso Zani, Bishop Emeritus of Città della Pieve, serving as co-consecrators. 
On 18 May 1643, he was appointed during the papacy of Pope Urban VIII as Bishop of Montefeltro.
He served as Bishop of Montefeltro until his death on 19 January 1667.

References

External links and additional sources
 (for Chronology of Bishops) 
 (for Chronology of Bishops) 
 (for Chronology of Bishops) 
 (for Chronology of Bishops) 

17th-century Italian Roman Catholic bishops
Bishops appointed by Pope Urban VIII
1581 births
1667 deaths